DGS Mastodon was a dredge, operated by the Government of Canada, keeping shipping channels clear in British Columbia.  She was ordered in 1909, from the Scottish shipyard William Simons and Company, and commissioned on May 13, 1911.

In 1942 she was transferred to the Royal Canadian Navy.  In 1946 she was sold to Imperial Oil, who then sold her to International Petroleum Company Limited, of Callao, Peru.  In 1963 she was scrapped, in Lima, Peru.

References

Dredges
Mastodon